Urocaridella is a genus of shrimps comprising the following species:

Urocaridella antonbruunii 
Urocaridella cyrtorhyncha 
Urocaridella degravei 
Urocaridella liui 
Urocaridella pulchella
Urocaridella urocaridella 
Urocaridella vestigialis

References

Palaemonidae